Prickly Moses is a common name for several plants and  may refer to:

Acacia brownii, endemic to eastern Australia
Acacia farnesiana
Acacia hubbardiana, native to north eastern Australia
Acacia pulchella, endemic to western Australia
Acacia ulicifolia, native to Australia
Acacia verticillata, native to south eastern Australia